Nithin Sathya (born 9 January 1980) is an Indian actor, film producer. He works primarily in Tamil Cinema.
He made his film debut in Kalatpadai, directed by J. Ramesh, in 2003. He acted with Kamal Hassan in a small role in the Tamil comedy film Vasool Raja MBBS, directed by Saran. His next film was Ji (2005), with Ajith Kumar, directed by N. Linguswamy.

Nithin Sathya appeared as the antagonist, a psychopathic villain Rathnavel Kalidas in the critically acclaimed psychological thriller, Satham Podathey (2007), which starred Pritviraj, Padmapriya and Suhasini, and was written and directed by Vasanth. Other films in which he acted include Raman Thediya Seethai, written and directed by K. P. Jagannath. In Pandhayam (2007) by S. A. Chandrasekhar with actor Vijay playing a cameo along with Sindhu Tolani.  Muthirai (2009), a Tamil-language thriller film.

He had his break through when he played the role of Palani in Chennai 600028 by Venkat Prabhu, who is a close associate and friend.  He played one of the leads in this sports drama film which was well received by the critics.  He reprised the same role in Chennai 600028 II. He has been the executive producer for the film R. K. Nagar starring Vaibhav in the lead which is produced by Venkat Prabhu.
The movie Jarugandi produced by Nithin Satya under his production house Shvedh was released on 26 October 2018.

Early life and education
Nitin Sathyaa did his schooling in Chennai at Gill Adarsh Matriculation Higher Secondary School and completed his master's degree in Business Administration specialising in International Marketing from London School of Commerce. After completing his education, NitinSathyaa decided to pursue acting in the year 2003. Apart from acting, he also represented Tamil Nadu at the National level in bowling in the year 1998–99.

Career

2000s

Nitin Sathyaa's first stint as an actor was Kalatpadai in 2003 directed by J. Ramesh. He played the role of a patient who attempts suicide due to love failure in Saran's 2004 movie Vasool Raja MBBS starring Kamal Hassan. . His subsequent movies were alongside renowned actors like Ajith Kumar in Ji and Vikram in the film Majaa.

He played one of the lead role in Venkat Prabhu's Chennai 600028. He played the antagonist in Vasanth's Satham Podathey. In Pandhayam, Nitin played the role of a student and this movie was directed by S. A. Chandrasekhar.

He played a reformed thief in K. P. Jagannath’s Raman Thediya Seethai, alongside Cheran, Pasupathy, Vimala Raman, Remya Nambeeshan.  His next movie was Palaivana Solai a remake of the 1982 film with the same title.

2010 – present

In Mayanginen Thayanginen, he plays the role of a call taxi driver who falls in love with a call center girl, Disha Pandey

His collaboration with Venkat Prabhu continued with the 2013 dark comedy Biriyani,  He followed it with Sundar C's horror comedy Aranmanai and once again collaborated with the same director for the unreleased Madha Gaja Raja.

2014 also saw the release of his two projects – Enna Satham Indha Neram and Thirudan Police.

He played the role of a self-centered son for Lakshmy Ramakrishnan in the film Ammani.

In 2016 he teamed up with Venkat Prabhu and S. P. B. Charan again for the sequel  Chennai 600028 II .  This film saw him continue to take up the role of Palani, from the first part.

Production

After years of acting as protagonist, antagonist and supporting roles, Nitinsathyaa started his own production house which he named as Shvedh.  Jarugandi was the first film to be released under this banner.

The second film Lock Up is a thriller movie the stars Vaibhav Reddy, Venkat Prabhu and Vani Bhojan in a lead role, set to release Zee5 14th August 2020.

Filmography

As an actor

As a producer

Short films

 Vellai Pookal
 Agalya 2012
 Kadal Rasa

References

External links
 

Indian male film actors
Tamil male actors
Living people
1976 births
Male actors from Chennai
Male actors in Tamil cinema